Sir Edward Deas Thomson  (1 June 1800 – 16 July 1879) was a Scotsman who became an administrator and politician in Australia, and was chancellor of the University of Sydney.

Background and early career
Thomson was born at Edinburgh, Scotland. His father, Sir John Deas Thomson, was accountant-general to the navy and married Rebecca, daughter of John Freer. Their son was educated at Edinburgh high school, and at Harrow in England. He afterwards spent two years in study at Caen in Normandy, France. His tutor there, from September 1815, was Joseph Lowe.

Thomson then began working with his father who at that time was reorganizing the system of keeping accounts in the navy. In 1826 Thomson visited the United States and Canada, and on his return in 1827 accepted the position of registrar of the orphan chambers at Demarara. Before leaving England he was able to arrange to exchange this position for that of clerk to the New South Wales legislative and executive councils.

In Australia

Thomson arrived in Sydney in December 1828 and proved to be a valuable officer. In January 1837 he became Colonial Secretary at a salary of £1500 a year and held this position for nearly 20 years. Although not without some criticism of the way he obtained the position, and that he was Governor Bourke's son-in-law. he carried out his duties with much tact. During the stormy period of the governorship of Sir George Gipps it has been said of him that he was personally so respected that members of the council found it almost painful to oppose him. His experience was particularly useful during the passing of the constitution bill, and he was sent with William Wentworth to England to see the bill through the Imperial parliament. In 1854 he was given a public testimonial, half the amount subscribed being expended on a piece of plate and the remainder given to Sydney University to found a scholarship in his name. Thomson was asked by the governor, Sir William Denison, to form the first government under the new constitution but was unable to do so. He entered the New South Wales Legislative Council and was vice-president of the executive council in the Parker ministry, and on 19 August 1857 moved for a select committee on the question of Australian federation. The committee reported in favour of a federal assembly being established but the Charles Cowper ministry had come into power in the meantime, and the question was shelved.

Thomson continued to be a member of the legislative council until his death, but his health had suffered from his heavy work as colonial secretary and he no longer attempted to take a leading part in its proceedings. He had been granted a substantial pension on his retirement in 1856 and he now had time to devote himself to other interests. He had been an original member of the senate of the University of Sydney when it was founded in 1850, he became vice-chancellor in 1863, and was chancellor from 1865 until 1878. He took an interest in sporting matters and for some years was president of the Australian Jockey Club. He also served as President of the Australian Club in Sydney.  During his visit to England he was appointed a Companion of the Order of the Bath (CB) and in 1874 he was created a Knight Commander of St Michael and St George (KCMG)

Personal life
Thomson married Anne Marie Bourke, the second daughter of Governor Sir Richard Bourke, who survived him with two sons and five daughters. His wife, a prominent activist, was one of the founding committee members for women and infant refuge Sydney Founding Institute, now The Infants' Home Child and Family Services. One daughter, Elizabeth, was mother of Edward Grigg, 1st Baron Altrincham; another, Susan Emmeline, married the politician-pastoralist William John Macleay, while another Eglantine Julia, married the politician William Campbell. His portrait is in the great hall of the University of Sydney. Thomson died on 16 July 1879 in Sydney.

See also

Members of the New South Wales Legislative Council
Thomson River
The Wool Road (New South Wales)
Vincentia, New South Wales

References

 

1800 births
1879 deaths
People educated at Harrow School
Members of the New South Wales Legislative Council
Australian Companions of the Order of the Bath
Australian Knights Commander of the Order of St Michael and St George
Colonial Secretaries of New South Wales
Scottish emigrants to colonial Australia
19th-century Australian politicians
19th-century Australian public servants
Chancellors of the University of Sydney
Sport Australia Hall of Fame inductees